Nazar Lytvyn (born March 22, 1983) is a Ukrainian footballer who played in the Ukrainian First League, Ukrainian Second League, and Canadian Soccer League

Playing career 
Lytvyn began his career in 1998 with FC Karpaty-2 Lviv in the Ukrainian Second League, and also played with FC Karpaty-3 Lviv. He later briefly played with FC Sokil Zolochiv before signing with FC Rava Rava-Ruska. During his tenure with Rava he captured the Druha Liha A championship in 2004. In 2006, he was transferred to FC Lviv of the Ukrainian First League, and signed with FC Halychyna Lviv in 2007. He later played with FC Arsenal-Kyivshchyna Bila Tserkva, and  Karpaty Kamenka-Bug. 

In 2016, he went overseas to Canada to sign with FC Ukraine United of the Canadian Soccer League. In his second season he assisted FC Ukraine in achieving a perfect season, and winning the Second Division Championship.

Honors

FC Rava Rava-Ruska  
 Ukrainian Second League: 2004-2005

FC Ukraine United 
 CSL II Championship: 2017

References

External links
 

1983 births
Living people
Sportspeople from Lviv
Ukrainian footballers
Ukrainian expatriate footballers
FC Karpaty-2 Lviv players
FC Karpaty-3 Lviv players
FC Rava Rava-Ruska players
FC Halychyna Lviv players
FC Arsenal-Kyivshchyna Bila Tserkva players
FC Ukraine United players
Canadian Soccer League (1998–present) players
Expatriate soccer players in Canada
Association football goalkeepers
Ukrainian First League players
Ukrainian Second League players